Boro is an extinct language once spoken in central eastern Ghana. In the vicinity of Worawora and Tapa, Rudolf Plehn found one old man who could still remember some words of this language, which according to him was spoken by more people in his younger years. 
The language is only known from the 12 lexical items collected by Plehn around the end of the 19th century and published in Seidel (1898). Westermann (1922) classified it as one of the Togorestsprachen, a classification followed by Glottolog, while Heine (1968:300) leaves it unclassified.

See also
 Ghana–Togo Mountain languages

References

Further reading
 Heine, Bernd (1968) Die Verbreitung und Gliedering der Togorestsprachen (Kölner Beiträge zur Afrikanistik vol. 1). Köln: Druckerei Wienand.
 Seidel, A. (1898) 'Beiträge zur Kenntnis der Sprachen in Togo. Aufgrund der von Dr. Rudolf Plehn und anderen gesammelten Materialien bearbeitet.' Zeitschrift für Afrikanischer und Oceanischer Sprachen, 4, p. 286.
 Westermann, Diedrich Hermann (1922) 'Vier Sprachen aus Mitteltogo. Likpe, Bowili, Akpafu und Adele, nebst einigen Resten der Borosprache. Nach Aufnahmen von Emil Funke und Adam Mischlich bearbeitet'. Mitteilungen des Seminars für Orientalische Sprachen, 25, 1-59.

Extinct languages of Africa
Niger–Congo languages
Unclassified languages of Africa
Languages extinct in the 19th century